Encantadia is a Philippine television drama fantasy series broadcast by GMA Network. The series is based on a 2005 Philippine television series of the same title. It served as a reboot and the fourth television series in the Encantadia franchise. Directed by Mark A. Reyes, it stars Kylie Padilla, Gabbi Garcia, Sanya Lopez and Glaiza de Castro. It premiered on July 18, 2016 on the network's Telebabad line up replacing Poor Señorita. The series concluded on May 19, 2017 with a total of 218 episodes. It was replaced by Mulawin vs. Ravena in its timeslot.

The series including a director's cut of the finale is streaming online on YouTube.

Premise
Four sisters – Pirena, Amihan, Alena and Danaya — guard the gems that hold the power to maintain peace and harmony in the world of Encantadia. Their bond is broken when Pirena discovers that their mother, is afraid of her desire to become the queen of Encantadia.

Cast and characters

Lead cast
 Glaiza de Castro as Pirena
 Kylie Padilla as Amihan
 Gabbi Garcia as Alena / Aquesha
 Sanya Lopez as Danaya

Supporting cast
 Mikee Quintos as Lira / Milagros "Mila" Quizon / Kambi
 Kate Valdez as Mira
 Rocco Nacino as Aquil
 Ruru Madrid as Ybrahim / Ybarro
 Janice Hung as Ether
 Solenn Heussaff as Cassiopei-a / Mata / ancient deity / Cassiopeia's twin / Avria
 Diana Zubiri as LilaSari
 Alfred Vargas as Amarro
 John Arcilla as Hagorn
 Rochelle Pangilinan as Agane / Andora
 Neil Ryan Sese as Asval
 Carlo Gonzales as Muros
 Pancho Magno as Hitano / Berdano
 Klea Pineda as Muyak 
 Buboy Villar as Wantuk 
 Cheska Iñigo as Mayca
 Noel Urbano as Imaw's voice
Daniel Dasalla Bato as Abog

Recurring cast
 Inah de Belen as Deshna / Luna
 Phytos Ramirez as Paolo Carlos "Paopao" Aguirre
 Arra San Agustin as Ariana / Amihan
 Marx Topacio as Azulan 
 Rey Talosig Jr. as Emre's voice
 Zoren Legaspi as Emre
 Karl Avalon as Pirena's mashna

Guest cast
 Marian Rivera as Mine-a
 Dingdong Dantes as Raquim
 Sunshine Dizon as Adhara
 Max Collins as Amihan I
 Dayara Shane as young Amihan / Cassandra
 Barbara Miguel as young Pirena 
 JC Movido as young Danaya 
 Althea Ablan as young Alena 
Chlaui Malayao as young Lira / Milagros
 Kariz Espiñosa as young Mira
 Jestoni Alarcon as Armeo
 Roi Vinzon as Arvak
 Barbara Miguel as teenage Pirena
 Angelu de Leon as Amanda Reyes-Quizon
 Ryan Eigenmann as Berto Reyes
 Miguel Tanfelix as Pagaspas
 Alden Richards as Lakan
 Janine Gutierrez as Agua
 Julianne Lee as Alira Naswen
 Ken Alfonso as Gamil
 Ana Feleo as Ades
 Christian Bautista as Apitong
 Jaycee Parker as Asnara
 John Feir as Jigs
 Joanna Marie Katanyag as Choleng
 Rafa Siguion-Reyna as Enuo
 Betong Sumaya as Rael
 Leandro Baldemor as Dado Quizon
 Lindsay de Vera as Dina
 Carmen del Rosario as Rosing
 Kyle Manalo as Louie
 Arny Ross as Silvia Montecarlo
 Nar Cabico as Banjo
 Avery Paraiso as Kahlil
 Maureen Larrazabal as Lanzu
 Ge Villamil as Orthana
 Ermie Concepcion as Vita
 Ervic Vijandre as Icarus 
 James Teng as Pakô
 Conan Stevens as Vish'ka
 Yuan Francisco as young Paopao / Paolo
 Vaness del Moral as Gurna
 Wynwyn Marquez as Helgad
 Edwin Reyes as Dagtum
 Rodjun Cruz as soul gem's spirit twin
 Migo Adecer as Anthony Montecarlo
 Eula Valdez as Avria
 Andy Smith as adult Anthony Montecarlo
 Tanya Gomez as Salome Aguirre
 Jake Vargas as Gilas
 Andre Paras as Wahid
 Joross Gamboa as Manik
 Ces Aldaba as Evades
 Mara Alberto as Kaizan
 Sheree Bautista as Odessa
 Jinri Park as Juvila
 Paolo Gumabao as Jamir
 Valeen Montenegro as Haliya
 Ian de Leon as Keros
 Lance Serrano as Memfes

Production

On November 5, 2015, Felipe Gozon, the chairman and CEO of GMA Network announced that the remake of the 2005 Philippine television series Encantadia is part of the network's program line-up for 2016. On January 6, 2016, director Mark A. Reyes said that he would return as the director of the series. Suzette Doctolero, who created Encantadia remained as concept creator and head writer for the series. It was Doctolero's first head writing project with the network in 2005, and also served as her training for writing a fantasy story.

The series was announced during Marian Rivera's renewal of contract with GMA Network on February 16, 2016, in which she was announced for the role of Mine-a. The following day, it was announced by director Mark Reyes in that the series was on pre-production. The first teaser of Encantadia premiered on February 14, 2016 featuring a snippet of the gems and the theme song. The first trailer was released June 11, 2016.

On September 15, 2016, the director stated that the retelling concluded after 43 episodes, and the 45th will be the start of the 2005's sequel, stating that "The retelling ends. And the sequel begins". He further added that it was not about 2005 version anymore, and new storyline will emerge on the series.

Casting
Marian Rivera plays the role of Mine-a. While Dingdong Dantes, who played Ybarro in the original series plays the role of Raquim. Klea Pineda and Migo Adecer also joined the cast as part of their prize after winning StarStruck.

On April 4, 2016, it was announced on 24 Oras that Kylie Padilla, Gabbi Garcia, Sanya Lopez and Glaiza de Castro were hired for the lead roles. According to Doctolero, de Castro is the only choice for the role she auditioned for. According to her, she watched and studied trainings from famous martial arts artists to get ready for the role. Other cast members including their roles also appeared after the announcement .

Sunshine Dizon, who played Pirena in the original series, revealed on May 6, 2016 that she takes part on the retelling-sequel of the 2016 series with a big but different character role, as Adhara. Meanwhile, Diana Zubiri who previously played Danaya is also cast as LilaSari.

A week before the show, Australian actor Conan Stevens, best known for his role on the American fantasy television series Game of Thrones, confirmed that he would join the cast in an unspecified role, which later on revealed as Vish'ka.

As the series progress, few special roles emerged; the first is Miguel Tanfelix who plays Pagaspas, a Mulawin with a mission to help the diwatas of Lireo. He played the same role 12 years ago on the series of the same name. The next would be Alden Richards, who will also play a Mulawin whose appearance has not yet been televised. In an interview with Manila Times, Richards said, "...11 years ago. I remember I watched the show with my family and I was so mesmerized with all the special effects. [...]When I learned that GMA was doing a ‘requel’ of Encantadia, I was really wishing to be a part of the show. That’s why when they told me that I have a role in the series, I was so happy...".

Costume design

Encantadia's costume designer is Francis Libiran, a world-renowned and critically acclaimed designer in the Philippines who did an extensive research to come up with the designs. According to Libiran, his team brainstormed together with Encantadia's production team and watched old clips of Encantadia in YouTube to conceptualized the character's fashion sense. The gowns of the sang'gres and Ynang Reyna is more edgy and fashionable compared to the ruggedness/cocky-themed costumes in 2005. Each gown depicts the powers and personalities of each sang'gre while showing one thing that they have in common- Royal. The colors of their gowns match the colors of the gems that the Sang’gres are guarding. Just like in the original series, they wore elegant gowns when they were not in a battle. He further stated, "A normal gown usually takes us two months to create but since we had to consider the time, we assigned a dedicated team of craftsmen to produce the outfits in just 15 days." According to the cast, they went on a strict diet and fitness trainings to secure their shape suited for their exquisite gowns. The cast first appeared in costumes during "ToyCon 2016 Poplife Fan Xperience" at the SMX Convention Center, Pasay on June 10, 2016.

Reception

Critical response
According to a review by CNN Philippines, Encantadia lived up to its long-gestating hype. The introduction and the narration was a big step-up for the show compared to the first one. It further stated that the new iteration looks better than the original and paces itself well in terms of narrative and plot. CNN was also impressed with the fight scenes giving impressions that are being done on a grander scale. They also stated that the scenes have depth and CG backgrounds are rendered beautifully and looks a lot slicker and a whole lot darker, looking like something from the PC version of Skyrim which they expressed as a huge improvement after over a decade. Anthea Reyes of WheninManila.com was also impressed of the series stating: "...all of our childish fantasies have returned to primetime television and it’s come back bigger, better, and infinitely more awesome..." She also stated that "the writing team is using this opportunity to the fullest to solidify the myth, the plot holes, and the motivations of everything. The writers of the show were able to place meaning in an aesthetic choice made from way before and further enrich the story." She also noted that the details of characters costume, to the clarified presence of the nomadic soldiers post Sappiro-Hathoria war, up until the background music used per every shot were all world class. FHM Philippines also made a review of the show and states that the creators of the show made an effort to make a living and breathing world and they succeeded. They also imposed that even though it was heavily inspired by Hollywood fantasy movies, it has the FIlipino flavor adding its own twist. They also pointed out that one of the shows strengths is that it has its own unique story. FHM further stated that: "...Like the original that came 11 years before it, Encantadia gives audiences something new to watch when it comes to primetime programming. Finally, something to cleanse our palate from all the drama and romantic programs that we've grown accustomed to."

A review by Philippine Entertainment Portal stated that the show’s director of photography and cameramen were impressive for utilizing different creative camera angles and techniques as it contributed to the intensity and excitement in the scene. They also gave positive feedback to its musical scoring stating that "...One of the factors that contributed to Encantadia 2005’s success is its musical scoring, in fact, it was even commended in the Asian Television Awards for Best Original Music Score. This requel did not disappoint when it comes to this aspect. The musical scorer seemed to compose different pieces suited to each kingdom since each had its own theme[...]the modernized, upbeat version of "Tadhana" also intensified the fight scenes."

Because of the good ratings and the success of the show, Encantadia is slated or expected to have another season. This was hinted on few scenes in its finale showing Cassiopea's twin,  who lives in the ice kingdom in the far northern part of Encantadia, seems to pose a threat to diwatas. This was attested further by an Instagram post of Director Mark Reyes that the finale episode is his "official statement".

Ratings
According to AGB Nielsen Philippines' Mega Manila household television ratings, the pilot episode of Encantadia earned a 26.1% rating. While the final episode scored a 13.8% rating in Nationwide Urban Television Audience Measurement people in television homes.

Accolades

Notes

References

External links
 
 

2016 Philippine television series debuts
2017 Philippine television series endings
Encantadia
Fantaserye and telefantasya
Filipino-language television shows
GMA Network drama series
Sequel television series
Serial drama television series
Television series reboots
Television shows set in the Philippines